Deers Ears Butte is a summit in South Dakota, in the United States.

Deers Ears Butte was so named on account of its outline being in the shape of erect deer's ears.

References

Landforms of Butte County, South Dakota
Mountains of South Dakota